William Cloud may refer to:
 William F. Cloud, officer in the Union Army
 William Horn Cloud, Native American musician